IDEA Health & Fitness Association is a membership association for fitness and wellness professionals. Since April 2022, its owner and CEO is Amy Boone Thompson. It was previously owned by Outside Inc., which had purchased it from Active Interest Media in 2020.

The association’s approximately 22,000 members hail from over 80 countries, with most members living and practicing their craft in North America. Members are personal fitness trainers, group fitness instructors, body-mind-spirit professionals (yoga, Pilates, etc.), and health club facility owners, managers and fitness program directors.

IDEA turns out 20 print educational vehicles per year—including its flagship magazine IDEA Fitness Journal, and the niche newsletters IDEA Trainer Success and IDEA Fitness Manager. Additionally, the association offers two free monthly digital information vehicles that reach approximately 70,000 people 24 times per year: IDEA Fit Tips & News and Inner IDEA Body-Mind-Spirit Review.

IDEA runs four live events and trade shows per year: IDEA World Fitness Convention; Inner IDEA Conference, IDEA Personal Trainer Institute West, and IDEA Personal Trainer Institute East. Cumulatively, an estimated 15,000 people travel to these four conferences from around the globe each year to amass research-based knowledge in their respective fitness and wellness specialty areas.

IDEA was founded in 1982 by Kathie Davis and Peter Davis to disseminate education and information to fitness industry professionals.

References

External links
 IDEA Health and Fitness Association

International professional associations